Interstate 82 (I-82) is the former designation for the following Interstate Highways between Scranton, Pennsylvania, and New York City:

Interstate 380 (Pennsylvania)
Interstate 80 in Pennsylvania, east of the present junction with I-380
Interstate 80 in New Jersey

82 (Pennsylvania-New York)
82
82
82
Scranton, Pennsylvania